Raúl José Asencio Moraes (born 20 May 1998) is a Spanish footballer of Brasilian descent who plays as a forward for Italian club Cittadella.

Club career

Genoa 
A graduate of the Burriana youth setup, Asencio won the attraction of Villarreal and Valencia while he played for the academy. On 15 July 2015, he signed for Italian club Genoa on a three-year deal and was initially assigned to the club's B-team. In the 2016–17 season with the reserves, he scored two braces, one against Ternana and another against Pisa.

Loan to Avellino 
In order to gain first team opportunities, Asencio joined Italian second tier club Avellino on 6 July 2017 on a season-long loan deal. However, failing to break to a first team, rumours arose of his parent club recalling him so that he could be loaned to any other club. However, in an interview given in August, Asencio denied this rumour. On 13 August, Asencio made his professional debut for Avellino in the third round of Coppa Italia as a substitute replacing Soufiane Bidaoui in the 68th minute of a 3–1 away defeat against Hellas Verona. On 26 August he made his debut in Serie B as a substitute replacing Matteo Ardemagni in the 91st minute of a 2–1 home win over Brescia. On 23 September he played his first entire match for Avellino, a 2–1 away win over Novara. On 24 October, Asencio score his first professional goal, and the winning goal in the 69th minute of a 1–0 home win against Pro Vercelli. On 28 December he scored his second goal in the 24th minute of a 2–1 home win over Ternana. On 3 February 2018, Asencio scored his third goal in the 10th minute of a 2–1 away defeat against Foggia. On 11 March he was sent off, as a substitute, with a red card in the 93rd minute of a 2–0 away defeat against Salernitana. Asencio ended his loan to Avellino with 32 appearances, 7 goals and 1 assist.

Loan to Benevento
On 3 August 2018, Asencio was loaned out to Benevento on a season-long loan. On 27 August he made his Serie B debut for Benevento as a substitute replacing Riccardo Improta in the 70th minute of a 3–3 home draw against Lecce. On 21 September he scored his first goal for the club, as a substitute, in the 95th minute of a 4–0 home win over Salernitana. Four days later, on 25 September, he played his first entire match for Benevento and he scored his second goal in the 37th minute of a 1–0 away win over Cittadella. On 4 December he played as a 73rd-minute substitute in a 1–0 home win over Cittadella in the fourth rund of Coppa Italia. On 14 April 2019, Asencio scored his third goal in the 89th minute of a 2–1 home defeat against Palermo. Asencio ended his loan with 23 appearances, 3 goals and 3 assists.

Loan to Pisa
On 6 August 2019, Asencio joined Serie B club Pisa on loan until 30 June 2020. His loan was terminated early with 3 league appearances and 1 Coppa Italia appearance, all as substitute.

Loan to Cosenza
On 17 January 2020, he moved on loan to Cosenza in Serie B until the end of the season.

Loan to Pescara
After appearing on the bench for Genoa in their first 2020–21 Serie A game against Crotone, on 28 September 2020 he joined Pescara on loan.

Loan to SPAL 
On 1 February 2021, Asencio joined Serie B club SPAL, on a loan deal.

Alcorcón
Asencio returned to Spain on 10 August 2021, after signing a two-year contract with Segunda División side AD Alcorcón. On 20 December, he posted a story on his Instagram profile showing himself driving at over 160 kilometres per hour while holding a coffee with the other hand; the following day, his contract with the club was terminated.

Lecce
On 20 January 2022, he returned to Italy and signed a contract with Lecce until 30 June 2022, with an option to extend for another season and another 3-year extension option.

Cittadella
On 21 June 2022, Asencio moved to Serie B club Cittadella.

Career statistics

Club

References

External links 

1998 births
Sportspeople from Castellón de la Plana
Living people
Association football forwards
Spanish people of Brazilian descent
Spanish footballers
Genoa C.F.C. players
U.S. Avellino 1912 players
Benevento Calcio players
Pisa S.C. players
Cosenza Calcio players
Delfino Pescara 1936 players
S.P.A.L. players
AD Alcorcón footballers
U.S. Lecce players
A.S. Cittadella players
Serie B players
Segunda División players
Spanish expatriate footballers
Expatriate footballers in Italy
Spanish expatriate sportspeople in Italy